Nashik District, a district in Maharashtra, India, is noted for the mountains and hills occupying the north and north-east of its territory. These hill ranges are eastward spurs of the Western Ghats and form prominent landmarks in the district, some noted for the shrines they harbor while others for the trekking adventures which can be undertaken while ascending the peaks. Broadly categorized, the hills can be segregated into 3 noteworthy ranges:

 Selbari Range which may be inclusive of the Dholbari range, alternately called  Selbari-Dholbari range.
 Satmala Range also called the Satmala-Ajanta range.
 Trimbakeshwar Range constituting the Trimbak-Anjaneri hills.

Selbari-Dolbari Range 

Selbari is a mountain range located at the northernmost extent of Nashik District forming a natural boundary between it and Dhule District.Most part of the range lies to the north of the Mausam River along an east to west axis turning around in a loop coming to lie south of the river to continue along in a west to east fashion. The southern part of the range is at times identified as a unique range called Dholbari. Alternatively, the range is referred to as the Selbari-Dolbari range.
The highest peak in the range, Salher (1,567m) also happens to the 2nd highest peak in Maharashtra  and is significant for being the highest fort in the Western Ghats.

Satmala Range 

Satmala is a mountain range which runs across Nashik District, Maharashtra. They are an integral part of the Sahyadris range within Nashik. These peaks are visible from a greater part of the district and form prominent landmarks. The highest of them is Dhodap (1,451 metres). Dhodap hill is third highest hill peak in Maharashtra after Kalsubai and Salher and 29th highest peak in Western Ghats. At the eastern side of this range lies the Chanvad range.

Trimbakeshwar 

It lies south of the city of Nashik and is significant for the Trimbakeshwar Shiva Temple located near the range. The northern face of the range is the birthplace of India's 2nd longest river Godavari. The southern face of these hills are covered with dense forests and thus form a catchment area for the Upper Vaitarna Reservoir, the most important and reliable source of potable water supply to the metropolitan city of Mumbai.
Brahmagiri (1,295meters) is the tallest peak in this range followed by Anjaneri peak(1,280meters).

List of peaks in Nashik

References 

Nashik district
Geography of Maharashtra by district